Debra C. Neil-Fisher (born May 12, 1958) is an American film editor. She has worked on several major films, including the Hangover series of movies.

Life and career 
Neil-Fisher was born in Los Angeles. She grew up in the San Fernando Valley and studied at the girls' school Argyll Academy until 1976, where a film course was offered that aroused her early interest in film. After her graduation in 1980, at the age of 21, she went back to her father and helped him in his dental practice. And although many of his patients worked in film business, no one could help them get there. It was only through a few of her acquaintances that she could make contact with a producer who offered her an assistant in an editing studio. After she accepted this, her first job was with a Rich Little spot for one of his Las Vegas shows. After one year, she left the company again.

Filmography (selection) 
 1984: Revenge of the Nerds (Revenge of the Nerds)
 1984: Children of the Corn (Assistant Assistant)
 1985: Gotcha! (Assistant editor)
 1987: Ray's Male Heterosexual Dance Hall
 1989: The Hillside Stirrers  (The Case of the Hillside Stranglers) 
 1990: Traces of the Past  (The Girl Who Came Between Them) 
 1991: Fried Green Tomatoes
 1991: V.I. Warshawski
 1992: Desperate Choices: To Save My Child
 1992: Dr. Giggles
 1992: Abducted - Seven Days of Fear  (Memphis) 
 1994: The War
 1996: Up Close and Personal
 1996: Dear God
 1997: Austin Powers: International Man of Mystery
 1999: Austin Powers: The Spy Who Shagged Me
 1999: Teaching Mrs. Tingle
 2000: Beautiful
 2001: Saving Silverman
 2003: National Security
 2003: How to Lose a Guy in 10 Days
 2004: Without a Paddle
 2004: Welcome to Mooseport
 2005: Son of the Mask
 2006: You, Me and Dupree
 2006: Just My Luck
 2008: Baby Mama
 2008: Semi-Pro
 2009: The Hangover
 2010: Iron Man 2
 2011: The Hangover Part II
 2013: The Hangover Part III
 2015: Fifty Shades of Grey
 2016: Grimsby
 2016: Teenage Mutant Ninja Turtles: Out of the Shadows
 2017: Transformers: The Last Knight
 2018: Fifty Shades Freed
 2019: A Dog's Way Home
 2020: Sonic the Hedgehog

References

External links 
 

1958 births
Living people
American film editors